Grizzly Peak is a high mountain summit in the Front Range of the Rocky Mountains of North America. Its proximate parent peak is Torreys Peak.

Location and geography
Grizzly Peak sits along the Continental Divide on the Front Range of the Rocky Mountains. The summit is located near Interstate 70, east of the Eisenhower-Johnson Memorial Tunnel. The larger Grays Peak and Torreys Peak sit nearby, and the closest major town is Silver Plume, Colorado. Other nearby points of interest include Loveland Ski Area, Breckenridge Ski Resort, Keystone Ski Resort and the Arapahoe Basin.

Climate

Other summits with same name
The state of Colorado actually has four other Grizzly Peaks and one Grizzly Mountain on record. The Grizzly Peak in Chaffee County, which sits in the Sawatch Range, is the tallest of these. The Summit County Grizzly Peak is fourth-tallest of the mountains, and is thus also referred to as "Grizzly Peak D":

Hiking

The trail to Grizzly Peak, which allows hikers to reach the summit of the mountain by foot, is accessible immediately off of a parking lot at Loveland Pass on U.S. Highway 6. Visitors can also reach Mount Sniktau, a smaller peak, from the same point along Loveland Pass.

From the summit, hikers can see Loveland Pass below them, plus views of nearby Chihuahua Lake and the Arapahoe Basin ski trails.

Historical names
Grizzly Peak 
Grizzly Peak D

See also

List of Colorado mountain ranges
List of Colorado mountain summits
List of Colorado fourteeners
List of Colorado 4000 meter prominent summits
List of the most prominent summits of Colorado
List of Colorado county high points

References

External links

Grizzly Peak D on 13ers.com
Grizzly Peak D on SummitPost

Mountains of Colorado
Mountains of Clear Creek County, Colorado
Mountains of Summit County, Colorado
Arapaho National Forest
North American 4000 m summits
Great Divide of North America